Crocus vitellinus  is a species of flowering plant in the genus Crocus of the family Iridaceae. It is a cormous perennial native to Lebanon-Syria, Palestine, and Turkey.

References

vitellinus